Sri Lankans in Japan consist of Sri Lankan migrants that come to Japan, as well as their descendants. In June 2022, there were 33,979 Sri Lankans living in Japan.

See also
 Sri Lankan diaspora

References

Sri Lankan diaspora in Asia
Immigration to Japan
Ethnic groups in Japan
Japanese people of Sri Lankan descent